Gilles Deschamps (also Gilles des Champs; Latinized as Aegidius Campensis) (date of death unknown) was a teacher and bishop of Coutances.  He was created cardinal by Antipope John XXIII on 6 July 1411, and thus considered a pseudocardinal (Pierre d'Ailly was another such cardinal).  Jean Gerson studied under both Deschamps and D'Ailly.

Deschamps was present at the trial of Joan of Arc (1431), where he "asked that the articles be read to counsel her, and a day assigned for her to appear, and that she be advised to reply."

References

Sources 
Consistories
The Avalon Project

15th-century deaths
Bishops of Coutances
15th-century French cardinals
15th-century French Roman Catholic bishops
Year of birth unknown